Lazu may refer to:

Romania
 Lazu, a village in Agigea Commune, Constanța County
 Lazu, a village in Terpezița Commune, Dolj County
 Lazu, a village in Malovăț Commune, Mehedinți County
 Lazu, a village in Gherghești Commune, Vaslui County
 Lazu, a tributary of the Danube–Black Sea Canal in Constanța County
 Lazu (Mureș), a tributary of the Mureș in Hunedoara County
 Lazu, a tributary of the Mara in Maramureș County
 Lazu, a tributary of the Crișul Pietros in Bihor County

India
 Lazu, Arunachal Pradesh, a village in Tirap district of Arunachal Pradesh in India

See also 
 Laz (disambiguation)